Lisowski, Lisowsky, Lisovsky or Lisovski is a surname with variants in multiple languages. It is derived from the Polish noun lisъ ("fox").

In Poland, the surname is particularly common in southern regions.

People 
 Aleksandra or Anastasia Lisovska, possible birth names of Hurrem Sultan (–1558), wife of Suleiman the Magnificent
 Aleksander Józef Lisowski (–1616), Polish-Lithuanian noble
 Bishop Franciszek Lisowski (1933-1939), Bishop of Tarnów, Poland
 Elwira Lisowska (born 1930), Polish immunologist
 Igor Lisovsky (born 1954), Soviet figure skater
 Inessa Lisovskaya (born 1964), Soviet rhythmic gymnast
 Jack Lisowski (born 1991), English professional snooker player
 Jan Lisowski (born 1952), Polish weightlifter who competed at the 1980 Summer Olympics
 Michel Adam Lisowski (born 1950), a Jewish Polish-French businessman
 Natalya Lisovskaya (born 1962), Soviet shot putter
 Reginald Lisowski (1926–2005), American professional wrestler
 Robert Lisovskyi (1893–1982), Ukrainian artist and graphic designer
 Stan Lisowski (born 1933), ring name of Canadian professional wrestler, Stan Holek
 Tomasz Lisowski (born 1985), Polish footballer (defender)
 William Lisowsky (1892–1959), Ukrainian-Canadian politician

Other uses 
 Lisowczycy, a 17th-century Polish-Lithuanian cavalry unit
 Wola Lisowska, a village in the administrative district of Gmina Lubartów

References 

Polish-language surnames
Slavic-language surnames

de:Lissowski
pl:Lisowscy